Lumir or Lumír may refer to:

 Lumír, a literary magazine in the Czech Republic, named after a bard of Czech legend.
 Lumír and Píseň, a sculpture of the bard, who is often depicted alongside a representation of "Song".

 Lumír Ondřej Hanuš
 Lumír and Píseň
 Lumír Kiesewetter
 Lumír Krejčí
 Lumír Mistr
 Lumír Sedláček